Humppa! is a 2001 compilation album by Eläkeläiset, mainly released to the Russian market.

Track listing 
 Orpopojan jenkka (Sex & Drugs & Rock'n'roll)
 Kuumaa humppaa (Hot Stuff)
 Elän humpalla (Living On A Prayer)
 Pyjamahumppa (Sleeping In My Car)
 Luikurihumppa (Personal Jesus)
 Humppaa tai kuole (No Limits)
 Jääkärihumppa (Final Countdown)
 Sortohumppa (Tere Perestroika)
 Humppaukaasi (We Will Rock You)
 Jenkkapolkkahumppa (Faster, Harder, Scooter)
 Päätön humppa (Enola Gay)
 Aamupalahumppa (Tom's Diner)
 Astuva humppa (These Boots Are Made For Walking)
 Niilo Yli-Vainio tervasi potkukelkkani jalakset (Jesus Built My Hot Rod)
 Humppalaki (Breaking The Law)
 Kuka humpan seisauttaa (Who Will Stop The Rain)
 Humppaleka (Viva Las Vegas)
 Humpataan, jumalauta! (Born To Lose)
 Humpalle vaan (Come Feel The Noise)
 Savua Laatokalla (Smoke On The Water)
 Humppaan itsekseni (Dancing With Myself)

External links 

 
Russian Eläkeläiset fanclub

2001 compilation albums
Eläkeläiset albums